Summer Nude is a 2013 Japanese television series that aired on Fuji Television on Mondays at 21:00 (JST) from July 8 to September 16, 2013. It starred Tomohisa Yamashita, Erika Toda and Karina Nose.

Cast 
 Tomohisa Yamashita as Asahi Mikuriya / 三厨 朝日
 Erika Toda as Hanae Taniyama / 谷山 波奈江
 Karina Nose as Natsuki Chiyohara / 千代原 夏希
 Masami Nagasawa as Kasumi Ichikura / 一倉 香澄
 Ryo Katsuji as Takashi Yaino / 矢井野 孝至
 Masataka Kubota as Hikaru Kirihata / 桐畑 光
 Shori Sato as Hayao Taniyama / 谷山 駿
 Mizuki Yamamoto as Aoi Horikiri / 堀切 あおい
 Yudai Chiba as Haruo Yoneda / 米田 春夫
 Ayami Nakajō as Mami Ichise / 一瀬 麻美
 Nanami Hashimoto as Kiyoko Ishikari / 石狩 清子
 Katsunori Takahashi as Kenji Shimojima / 下嶋 賢二
 Yuka Itaya as Setsuko Shimojima / 下嶋 勢津子
 Shigeru Saiki as Fumihiro Kominami /小南 文博

Episodes

References

External links 
  

Japanese drama television series
2013 Japanese television series debuts
2013 Japanese television series endings
Fuji TV dramas